The 1976 Stockholm Open was a men's tennis tournament played on hard courts and part of the 1976 Commercial Union Assurance Grand Prix and took place at the Kungliga tennishallen in Stockholm, Sweden. It was the eighth edition of the tournament and was held from 7 November through 13 November 1976. Mark Cox won the singles title.

Finals

Singles

 Mark Cox defeated  Manuel Orantes, 4–6, 7–5, 7–6(7–3)

Doubles

 Bob Hewitt /  Frew McMillan defeated  Tom Okker /  Marty Riessen, 6–4, 4–6, 6–4

References

External links
  
  
 Association of Tennis Professionals (ATP) tournament profile

Stockholm Open
Stockholm Open
Stock
Stockholm Open
1970s in Stockholm